The Festival della Valle d'Itria is a summer opera festival held in the south eastern Italian town of Martina Franca in the Apulia region.  The Festival was founded in 1975 and performances are given in July and August each summer on a specially constructed stage in the outdoor courtyard of the Palazzo Ducale.

The primary aim of the festival is to present obscure, neglected or rarely performed works, and often works in the standard operatic repertoire are given in their original versions (such as Verdi's original 1857 version of Simon Boccanegra).

Notable revivals include:

33rd Festival 2007 Marcella by Umberto Giordano
34th Festival 2008 Pelagio (opera) by Saverio Mercadante
2012 Artaserse (1730 Venice version) by Hasse
2015 Medea in Corinto by Mayr
2017 Margherita d'Anjou by Giacomo Meyerbeer
2022 Il Xerse by Francesco Cavalli
2023 L'Orazio by Pietro Auletta

Since 2021 the German opera manager Sebastian F. Schwarz serves as Artistic Director of the festival alongside its longtime music director Fabio Luisi.

References

External links
 Official Festival website, in English

Opera festivals
Italian music
Martina Franca
Tourist attractions in Apulia
Classical music festivals in Italy
1975 establishments in Italy
Music festivals established in 1975